The Orakzai Scouts is a paramilitary regiment forming part of the Frontier Corps Khyber Pakhtunkhwa (North) in Pakistan. The name alludes to the Orakzai tribe and the Orakzai Agency (now a district in Khyber Pakhtunkhwa province).

History
The regiment was raised in 1972. The Scouts have been involved in anti-drug smuggling operations. In 2011-2012, the unit received a number of drug testing kits, through a United Nations programme, to assist in their work against drug smuggling. One initiative in August 2021 saw the Scouts 235 Wing organise training to help farmers find alternatives to poppy cultivation such as mushroom farming.

The regiment has been involved in combatting the insurgency in Khyber Pakhtunkhwa. Shortly after the start of Operation Khyber by the Pakistani military, eight  soldiers were killed in November 2014, when militants attacked a check post. Twenty militants were killed in an immediate counterattack by the regiment.

In July 2019 members of the regiment helped rescue up to 47 injured people and retrieved the bodies of 8 children, after they became trapped in a collapsed house following a rainstorm.

The regiment has also engaged in local culture recently. In partnership with provincial and local government bodies in March 2022, it organised a two-day local sports festival in Kalaya including a kabbadi competition. The Commandant attended a motoring event in December 2022.

Units

 Headquarters Wing
 231 Wing
 232 Wing
 233 Wing

 234 Wing
 235 Wing
 236 Wing
 Special Operation Group

References

Regiments of the Frontier Corps
Orakzai District
Frontier Corps Khyber Pakhtunkhwa (North)